Michele Kratky (born January 19, 1957) is an American politician. She was a member of the Missouri House of Representatives, having served from 2009 – 2017. She is a member of the Democratic party.

Early life 
Kratky was born and raised in south St. Louis, where she attended St. Mary Magdalene and Immaculate Heart of Marcy parish schools. She graduated from Southwest High School in 1975. Her mother, Eileen O'Toole, was committeewoman of the 16th Ward Regular Democratic organization, and confidante of Mayor A.J. Cervantes. Through her mother, Kratky was exposed at an early age to Democratic politics and public service. She was raised Roman Catholic.

Career 
Kratky was first elected to the Missouri House of Representatives in 2008. Previously she served as the director of governmental affairs for the St. Louis Association of REALTORS. Prior to that, she worked for years as a legal secretary, and briefly as a court clerk.

Personal life 
Kratky married Fred Kratky, himself a former Missouri State Representative, in 1980. Together, they have four sons, and one granddaughter.

References

1957 births
21st-century American politicians
21st-century American women politicians
Living people
Democratic Party members of the Missouri House of Representatives
Politicians from Kansas City, Missouri
Politicians from St. Louis
Women state legislators in Missouri